Pope Innocent II (r. 1130–1143) created 76 cardinals in twelve consistories held throughout his pontificate. The pope created as cardinals his future successor Lucius III and the antipope Victor IV.

1130
 Balduino da Pisa O.Cist.
 Pietro
 Stanzio
 Luc O.Cist.
 Adinolfo O.S.B.
 Innocenzo Savelli
 Gregorio
 Siro
 Azzone degli Atti
 Odone Fattiboni
 Gaymer
 Guido da Vico
 Guido
 Guido
 Alberto Teodoli
 Silvano
 Vassalo
 Lucio Boezio O.S.B. Vall.
 Vitale Savelli

1132
 Martino O.Cist.

1133
 Pietro O.S.B. Cas.
 Ubaldo da Lunata
 Angelo
 Guido
 Ubaldo

1134
 Drogon O.S.B.
 Theodwin Can. Reg. O.S.A.
 Stefano
 Gregorio Papareschi iuniore
 Chrysogone O.S.B.
 Gerardo
 Pietro

1135
 Ugo
 Griffone
 Yves Can. Reg.

1136
 Alberto
 Bernardo

1137
 Stanzio
 Cosma

1138
 Albéric O.S.B. Clun.
 Guido Bellagi
 Gregorio
 Raniero
 Matteo
 Goizzone
 Ottaviano de' Monticelli
 Ribaldo
 Ubaldo

1139
 Hugh de Saint-Victor Can. Reg. O.S.A.
 Etienne O.Cist.
 Egmondo
 Presbitero
 Rabaldo
 Tommaso
 Raniero
 Goizo
 Aimerico
 Presbitero

17 December 1140
 Pietro
 Longino
 Tommaso Can. Reg.
 Rainaldo di Collemezzo O.S.B. Cas.
 Ubaldo
 Pietro
 Pietro
 Guido Moricotti
 Niccolò
 Hugues de Foliet O.S.B.
 Guido di Castelfidardo

1141
 Ubaldo Allucingoli O.Cist.
 Gilberto
 Gregorio

March 1142
 Imar O.S.B.
 Pietro Papareschi
 Robert Pullen
 Bd. Konrad von Bayern O.Cist.

Notes and references

Sources

College of Cardinals
Innocent II
12th-century cardinals
12th-century Catholicism
Pope Innocent II